Tapinoma (from Greek ταπείνωμα low position) is a genus of ants that belongs to the subfamily Dolichoderinae. The genus currently comprises 74 described species distributed worldwide in tropical and temperate regions. Members of are generalized foragers, nesting in a wide variety of habitats, ranging from grasslands, open fields, woodlands, to inside buildings. The majority of species nest in the ground under objects such as stones or tree logs, other species build nests under bark of logs and stumps, in plant cavities, insect galls or refuse piles.

Species

Tapinoma aberrans (Santschi, 1911)
Tapinoma acuminatum Forel, 1907
Tapinoma albinase (Forel, 1910)
Tapinoma albomaculatum (Karavaiev, 1926)
Tapinoma amazone Wheeler, 1934
Tapinoma andamanense Forel, 1903
Tapinoma annandalei (Wheeler, 1928)
Tapinoma antarcticum Forel, 1904
Tapinoma arnoldi Forel, 1913
Tapinoma atriceps Emery, 1888
†Tapinoma baculum Zhang, 1989
Tapinoma carininotum Weber, 1943
Tapinoma chiaromontei Menozzi, 1930
Tapinoma christophi Emery, 1925
Tapinoma danitschi Forel, 1915
Tapinoma demissum Bolton, 1995
†Tapinoma electrinum Dlussky & Perkovsky, 2002
Tapinoma emeryanum Kuznetsov-Ugamsky, 1927
Tapinoma emeryi (Ashmead, 1905)
Tapinoma epinotale Karavaiev, 1935
Tapinoma erraticum (Latreille, 1798)
Tapinoma festae Emery, 1925
Tapinoma flavidum André, 1892
Tapinoma fragile Smith, 1876
Tapinoma funiculare Santschi, 1928
Tapinoma geei Wheeler, 1927
Tapinoma gibbosum Stitz, 1933
†Tapinoma glaesaria Perrichot, Salas-Gismondi & Antoine, 2019 (formerly T. aberrans Dlussky, 2002)
Tapinoma glaucum (Viehmeyer, 1916)
Tapinoma heyeri Forel, 1902
Tapinoma himalaica Bharti, Kumar & Dubovikoff, 2013
Tapinoma indicum Forel, 1895
Tapinoma israele Forel, 1904
Tapinoma karavaievi Emery, 1925
Tapinoma kinburni Karavaiev, 1937
Tapinoma krakatauae (Wheeler, 1924)
Tapinoma latifrons (Karavaiev, 1933)
Tapinoma litorale Wheeler, 1905
Tapinoma luffae (Kurian, 1955)
Tapinoma lugubre Santschi, 1917
Tapinoma luridum Emery, 1908
Tapinoma luteum (Emery, 1895)
Tapinoma madeirense Forel, 1895
Tapinoma melanocephalum (Fabricius, 1793)
Tapinoma minimum Mayr, 1895
Tapinoma minor Bernard, 1945
†Tapinoma minutissimum Emery, 1891
Tapinoma minutum Mayr, 1862
Tapinoma modestum Santschi, 1932
Tapinoma muelleri Karavaiev, 1926
†Tapinoma neli Perrichot, Salas-Gismondi & Antoine, 2019
Tapinoma nigerrimum (Nylander, 1856)
Tapinoma opacum Wheeler & Mann, 1914
Tapinoma orthocephalum Stitz, 1934
Tapinoma panamense Wheeler, 1934
Tapinoma philippinense Donisthorpe, 1942
Tapinoma pomone Donisthorpe, 1947
Tapinoma pygmaeum (Dufour, 1857)
Tapinoma ramulorum Emery, 1896
Tapinoma rasenum Smith & Lavigne, 1973
Tapinoma rectinotum Wheeler, 1927
Tapinoma sahohime Terayama, 2013
Tapinoma schreiberi Hamm, 2010
Tapinoma schultzei (Forel, 1910)
Tapinoma sessile (Say, 1836)
Tapinoma silvestrii Wheeler, 1928
Tapinoma simrothi Krausse, 1911
Tapinoma sinense Emery, 1925
Tapinoma subboreale Seifert, 2012
Tapinoma subtile Santschi, 1911
†Tapinoma troche Wilson, 1985
Tapinoma wheeleri (Mann, 1935)
Tapinoma williamsi (Wheeler, 1935)
Tapinoma wilsoni Sharaf & Aldawood, 2012
Tapinoma wroughtonii Forel, 1904

References

External links

 
Dolichoderinae
Ant genera